Francis José da Silva, known as just Francis,  (born April 30, 1982 in São Vicente de Minas), is a Brazilian footballer who plays for Red Bull Brasil as a defensive midfielder.

Honours
São Paulo State Championship: 2008

External links
 sambafoot
 Guardian Stats Centre 
 palmeiras.globo.com
 zerozero.pt
 CBF
 globoesporte

1982 births
Living people
Brazilian footballers
Association football midfielders
Sociedade Esportiva Palmeiras players
Ituano FC players
Clube Atlético Mineiro players
Guaratinguetá Futebol players